Hezarabad (also Romanized as Hezārābād and Hazārābād; also known as Hizārābād) is a village in Mazraeh Now Rural District, in the Central District of Ashtian County, Markazi Province, Iran. At the 2006 census, its population was 129, in 41 families.

References 

Populated places in Ashtian County